Bols is a brand name used by Lucas Bols, a Dutch distiller of alcoholic beverages.  The brand line currently consists of vodkas, gins, genevers and liqueurs.  Bols has been extant since 1575, and claims to be the oldest distillery brand in the world.  The brand is now distributed in 110 countries, and the liqueur line has over 30 different flavors.  As the result of an earlier divestiture, in Eastern Europe the Bols brand is owned by Maspex.

It is Ray Charles's choice of drink in the movie Ray.

There are certain cocktails that are used bols like: 

Indonezian "Bamblabana" (vodka, eviation, lime, ginger and hot pepper sos), 

Norway "Dverg" (vodka, heavy cream, cherry juice),

Greece "Bolz" (vodka, fig juice, pomegranate juice, bourbon, lemon)

Notes  

Alcoholic drink brands
Dutch distilled drinks 
Dutch vodkas
Dutch brands
ja:ボルス
nl:Lucas Bols